Kolamaavu Kokila (abbrev. COCO) is a 2018 Indian Tamil-language black comedy crime film written and directed by Nelson in his directorial debut, and produced by Lyca Productions. The film stars Nayanthara alongside a supporting cast including Yogi Babu, Saranya Ponvannan, R. S. Shivaji, Charles Vinoth, Hareesh Peradi and Jacqueline. Anirudh Ravichander composed the film's music. 

The film received positive reviews from critics who praised the performances of the cast(particularly Nayanthara), use of black comedy, technical aspects, screenplay and direction. It was remade in Hindi language as Good Luck Jerry (2022).

Plot 
The film opens with the killing of a police officer by a cocaine-dealer lord Bhai and his henchmen. Kokila struggles to find a job to take care of her parents and sister. She stumbles on the cocaine smuggling business of Mohan. When her mother is diagnosed with lung cancer, Kokila is forced to work for Mohan. Her cunningness earns her a name in the business. The new inspector Guru is a no-nonsense cop and cracks down on drug dealers. Kokila is almost caught a couple of times but manages to evade the authorities. She convinces Mohan to kill two of his henchmen suspected of leaking information and then decides to quit the business. Mohan seemingly agrees but tries to kill her, however an enraged Kokila brutally murders Mohan and his men and tries to flee with her family but is caught by Bobi, who had recruited her initially.

He demands that she deliver a one last consignment of 100 kilos to Alphonse. Kokila is forced to accept and enlists the help of her family. Shekhar and Lakshman Kumar join them unaware of their smuggling. She delivers the load, but it is revealed that she switched most of it for salt. She then tricks Bobi to double-cross Bhai and then frames him for swindling Bhai. She has him killed and continues the shipment run. On the way, she is caught by the police, who were Alphonse's men in disguise. She manages to avoid getting tortured and kills off her captors with the help of her family. Guru tracks her down and arrests her. Kokila makes a deal with him to nab Bhai and bring the whole drug business down. The plan works out, Bhai is shot dead by Guru, and Kokila and her family escape punishment and Guru helps the family by giving some financial support.  In the end, the family starts a legitimate business of Kolam powder, calling it 'Kolamaavu Kokila'.

Cast 

 Special appearances in the promotional song "Kabiskabaa CoCo"
Bijili Ramesh
Lollu Sabha Manohar
Theepetti Ganesan

 Special appearances in the promotional song "Gun In Kadhal"
Anirudh Ravichander

Production 
Nelson Dilipkumar, a creative director associated with the programs for the television channel Star Vijay, earlier announced a project in 2011 titled Vettai Mannan starring Silambarasan, Jai, Deeksha Seth and Hansika Motwani. But the film ran into production trouble, despite half of the film's shoot being completed. In July 2017, on recommendation of composer Anirudh Ravichander, Lyca Productions roped in Nelson to direct a female-oriented film starring Nayanthara in the lead. Sources from the production house claimed that, the film will be a "black comedy on the lines of Naanum Rowdy Dhaan". It further added that Nayanthara was impressed with the script and the production house had her dates as the actress relieved off all her other commitments. Post the announcement of the film, the team further discussed with Saranya Ponvannan and Yogi Babu to cast them in prominent roles, with Sivakumar Vijayan and R. Nirmal were announced as the cinematographer and editor. While the title was initially announced as CoCo, it was further changed to Kolamaavu Kokila.

The shoot began on 23 August 2017, with television anchor Jacqueline joined the cast during the first schedule. Nelson Dilipkumar added that the film will be shot extensively across Chennai and its outskirts. Despite eight days of shoot being continued, production came to a halt on 1 September after a strike organised by Film Employees Federation of South India which lasted for 12 days. Shooting of the film went ahead for four months and was completed on 5 January 2018.

Soundtrack 
The film's six-song soundtrack and score is composed by Anirudh Ravichander, in his first collaboration with Nelson Dilipkumar. Lyrics for the songs were written by Vivek, Vignesh Shivan, Arunraja Kamaraj and actor Sivakarthikeyan, in his first stint as lyricist. After three songs — "Edhuvarayo", "Kalyana Vayasu" and "Orey Oru" — were released as singles on 8 March, 15 May and 13 June 2018, the soundtrack was released by Zee Music Company on 23 July 2018. The song "Kalyana Vayasu" was a viral hit, but Anirudh was accused of plagiarising the tunes from Sannan's "Don't Lie" and Chibz's "Feeling Me", for the song. Responding to the allegations, the composer revealed that he had used the license for the beat. The song was later removed from YouTube, citing the copyright issues and another version sung by Abhay Jodhpurkar was uploaded to YouTube on 25 January 2019, drawing criticism from its audience.

The soundtrack received positive response from critics. Behindwoods gave 3 out of 5 stars, saying that the album "is full of youthful exuberance" and "gives a trippy experience". Thinkal Menon of The Times of India reviewed the album as a "pleasant one" although it reminds of Anirudh's previous works". Moviecrow rated 3.75/5 stating "Anirudh Ravichander's knack for delivering catchy and immensely enjoyable tracks continues in Kolamaavu Kokila." Karthik Srinivasan of Milliblog called it as "one of Anirudh's best" further praising him for "producing massively entertaining music".

Release 
Kolamavu Kokila was released on 17 August 2018.

Reception

Critical response 
M.Suganth of The Times of India gave the film 3.5 out of 5 praising the direction and technical aspects and wrote "The film is an out-and-out star vehicle that keeps giving its star whistle-worthy moments. And most remarkably, it manages to stay true to its genre and ensures that the script comes before the star." Ashameera Aiyappan of The Indian Express gave the film 3 out of 5 writing " praising the performances, writing and technical aspects.

Box office 
The film collected  in five days in Tamil Nadu. In its first nine days, the film had grossed .

Remake
Despite the Dubbed version of this film, a Hindi remake of the film, Good Luck Jerry is being produced by Aanand L. Rai starring Janhvi Kapoor, who is reprising the role played by Nayanthara.

Awards and nominations

References

External links 
 

2010s Tamil-language films
2018 black comedy films
2010s crime comedy films
2018 directorial debut films
Films involved in plagiarism controversies
Films scored by Anirudh Ravichander
Indian black comedy films
Indian crime comedy films
Films about drugs
Fictional portrayals of the Tamil Nadu Police
Films about cocaine
Films about the Narcotics Control Bureau
Films set in Chennai
Films shot in Chennai
Films directed by Nelson (director)